Turkey hosts 138 embassies in Ankara. Several other countries have ambassadors accredited to Turkey, with most being resident in Berlin or Brussels. This listing excludes Honorary Consulates.

Missions in Ankara

Embassies

Other missions and delegations 
 (Delegation)
 (Taipei Economic and Cultural Mission in Ankara)
 (Representative Office)
 (Russia) (Foreign Economic Relations Office)

Gallery

Consular Missions

Adana
 (Consulate)

Antalya

 (Consulate)
 (Consulate)

 (Consulate)
 (Vice Consulate)

Bursa
 (Consular Office)

Çanakkale
 (Consulate)

Edirne
 
 (Consulate)

Erzurum

Gaziantep

Iğdır
 (Consular Mission)

Istanbul

 (Representative Office)
 (Representative Office) 
 (Representative Office)
 (Representative Office)

Gallery

Izmir

 
 
 (Consulate)
 
 
 (Consulate)

Kars

Mersin

Trabzon

Accredited non-resident diplomatic and consular missions 
Resident in Berlin, Germany

Resident in Brussels, Belgium

Other Resident Cities

 (Geneva)
 (New Delhi)
 (Paris)
 (Cairo)
 (Doha)
 (New York City)
 (Moscow)
 (Copenhagen)
 (Vienna)
 (Rome)
 (Geneva)
 (Rome)
 (New York City)
 (Rome)
 (Cairo)  
 (New York City)
 (Islamabad)
  (Tehran)
 (Sofia)
 (Tokyo)
 (Canberra)
 (Canberra)

Embassies to open

States with no relations

See also
Foreign relations of Turkey
List of diplomatic missions of Turkey
Visa requirements for Turkish citizens

Notes

References 

list
Turkey
Diplomatic missions